Minesweeper Suite is the second mixtape by breakcore DJ and producer DJ /rupture released in 2002 on the Tigerbeat6 record label.

Track listing
 "Jibal Al Nuba/Gemini Dub" (J Boogie, MahmoudFadi) – 4:37
 "High Resolution/Tectonic" (DJ /rupture, Heat Sensor) – 3:14
 "Rumbo Babylon/Limb by Limb (Acappella)/Latoya: Version/Tables Will Turn" (Baby Cham, DJ /rupture, Foxy Brown, General Degree, Cutty Ranks) – 4:16
 "Untitled A1 {From Nubus}/Ruff Enuff [Instrumenta]/Tables Will Turn [Mega Mix]" (Akrobatic, Baby Cham, Foxy Brown, So Takahashi) – 2:22
 "Serranito/Froggy/Maffe Rhythm" (Kazamix, Rober Kimou, Nettle) – 4:03
 "62 Ouf" (Mad Killah, Mister Faycal) – 2:28
 "Bad Man Lighter [Jump Up Mix]/Drums Conductor/Angels: A cappella" (DJ Rush Puppy, Elastic Horizons, Wax Poetic) – 2:37
 "In Front of You" (DJ /rupture) – 4:18
 "Fallen Angels/Same Time: A cappella/3.37/I Remember Nothing More [DJ /rupture's needlepoint mix]" (Cul de Sac, DAT Politics, Mentol Nomad, Missing Linx) – 3:31
 "Ballad of Jimmy Hollin [Disco Mix]/Dub Warming/Untitled B2 {From Docile #4}/I Don't Invite" (D. Wulle & A. Garcia, DJ 007, Fish & Goat at the Controls, Nettle) – 2:40
 "Ziggurat/Plain Gold Ring" (Gregory Whitehead, Nina Simone) – 5:02
 "Police State (Acappella)/Babomb/Crossing Kingston Bridge/Tanzila/Untitled b1 from "Nubus"" (Dead Prez, DJ Mutamassik, Joshua Abrams, Music of The Pearl Divers, So Takahashi) – 3:27
 "Igbal Jobi and Party" (Sorath) – 3:05
 "Ruled By The Mob/Apna Sangheet Sings Apna Sangheet (Speedy Gonzalez Mix)" (Bodysnatcher, Sardara Gill) – 3:02
 "Up from the Underground (Instrumental)" (The Temple Of Hiphop Culture) – 1:08
 "Enemy/Up from the Underground" (Rotator, The Temple of Hiphop Culture) – 2:46
 "Discipline of D.E./Trasn 'n Ready" (DJ Scud, Rotator) – 2:27
 "From Alright Reverse Vol.2,/Untitled from "L'Atlas des Galaxies Etranges"/Show 2 Show (DJ /rupture Remix) /Associations Libres" (BlackJewishGays, Borbetomagus, DJ Mutamassik, Gilles Gobeil) – 1:49
 "Bloody Nora/Rough & Rugged" (Aphasic, Shinehead) – 1:55
 "Masturbator/Killing Me Softly" (Eiterherd, Roberta Flack) – 2:50
 "Are You That Somebody? (Instrumental)/Brother Hunter/Dandy/Degradmentation/Other Voices 1" (Aaliyah, Djivan Gasparyan, Kid 606, Nettle, Rik Rue) – 4:48
 "MHh04" (The Kat Cosm) – 1:15
 "I Am Soundboy/Big Work/We Started This (Acappella)/Everlasting Life" (Cex, Donna Summer, Eightball & M.J.G., Jingles) – 2:23

External links 
 Minesweeper Suite on Tigerbeat6
 DJ /rupture: Minesweeper Suite at Discogs.com

2002 albums
Tigerbeat6 albums
DJ /rupture albums